Lasiothyris is a genus of moths belonging to the family Tortricidae.

Species
Lasiothyris astricta (Razowski & Becker, 1983)
Lasiothyris cerastes Razowski & Becker, 1986
Lasiothyris cnestovalva Razowski & Becker, 1986
Lasiothyris competitrix (Razowski & Becker, 1983)
Lasiothyris diclada Razowski & Becker, 1986
Lasiothyris exocha Razowski & Becker, 2007
Lasiothyris ficta (Razowski & Becker, 1983)
Lasiothyris gravida Razowski, 1986
Lasiothyris guanana Razowski & Becker, 2007
Lasiothyris heterophaea (Clarke, 1968)
Lasiothyris ichthyochroa (Walsingham, 1897)
Lasiothyris ilingocornuta Razowski & Becker, 1993
Lasiothyris limatula Meyrick, 1917
Lasiothyris luminosa (Razowski & Becker, 1983)
Lasiothyris megapenis Razowski & Becker, 1993
Lasiothyris micida Razowski & Becker, 1986
Lasiothyris omissa Razowski & Becker, 1993 
Lasiothyris perlochra Razowski & Becker, 2002
Lasiothyris pervicax Razowski & Becker, 1993
Lasiothyris puertoricana Razowski & Becker, 2007
Lasiothyris revulsa Razowski & Becker, 1993
Lasiothyris sorbia Razowski & Becker, 1993
Lasiothyris subdiclada Razowski & Becker, 2002
Lasiothyris subsorbia Razowski & Becker, 2007
Lasiothyris taima Razowski & Becker, 2002
Lasiothyris tardans Razowski & Becker, 1993

Former species
Lasiothyris docilis Razowski & Becker, 2002
Lasiothyris perjura Razowski & Becker, 1993

See also
List of Tortricidae genera

References

 , 1917, Trans. ent. Soc. Lond. 1917: 4
 ,2005 World Catalogue of Insects, 5
 , 2011: Diagnoses and remarks on genera of Tortricidae, 2: Cochylini (Lepidoptera: Tortricidae). Shilap Revista de Lepidopterologia 39 (156): 397–414.
 , 2002: Systematic and faunistic data on Neotropical Cochylini (Lepidoptera: Tortricidae), with descriptions of new species. Part.1. Acta zool. cracov. 45: 287-316

External links
tortricidae.com

Cochylini
Tortricidae genera